Aftab Alam (born 27 April 1984) is a Pakistani first-class cricketer who played for Peshawar cricket team. He was named as man of the match in the final of the 2010–11 Quaid-e-Azam Trophy, playing for Habib Bank Limited.

References

External links
 

1984 births
Living people
Pakistani cricketers
Habib Bank Limited cricketers
Peshawar cricketers
Cricketers from Peshawar